Circoviridae is a family of DNA viruses. Birds and  mammals serve as natural hosts. There are 101 species in this family, assigned to 2 genera. Diseases associated with this family include: PCV-2: postweaning multisystemic wasting syndrome; CAV: chicken infectious anemia.

Structure
Viruses in the family Circoviridae are non-enveloped, with icosahedral and round geometries, and T=1 symmetry. The diameter is around 20 nm. Genomes are circular and non-segmented, around 3.8kb in length. The capsid consists of 12 pentagonal trumpet-shaped pentamers. There are two main open reading frames arranged in opposite directions that encode the replication and capsid proteins. Alternative start codons are common in the avian species.

Life cycle
Viral replication is nuclear. Entry into the host cell is achieved by penetration into the host cell. Replication follows the ssDNA rolling circle model. DNA templated transcription, with some alternative splicing mechanism is the method of transcription. The virus exits the host cell by nuclear egress, and  nuclear pore export. A stem loop structure with a conserved nonanucleotide motif is located at the 5' intergenic region of circovirus genomes and is thought to initiate rolling-cycle replication.
Birds and  mammals serve as the natural host. Transmission routes are fecal-oral.

Taxonomy
The family Circoviridae contains two genera—Circovirus and Cyclovirus.

Genus Circovirus: type species: Porcine circovirus 1
Genus Cyclovirus : type species Human associated cyclovirus 8

Clinical
A cyclovirus—cyclovirus-Vietnam—has been isolated from the cerebrospinal fluid of 25 Vietnamese patients with CNS infections of unknown aetiology. The same virus has been isolated from the faeces of healthy children and also from pigs and chickens. This suggests an orofaecal route of transmission with a possible animal reservoir.

See also
Animal viruses

References

External links
 ICTV Online Report; Circoviridae
 ICTVdB Entry for Circoviridae
 Viralzone: Circoviridae

 
Animal virology
Virus families